Jahanara Alam (born 1 April 1993) is a Bangladeshi cricketer who plays for the Bangladesh women's national cricket team. She is a right-arm medium pace bowler and right-handed batter. She was a member of the team that won a silver medal in cricket against China at the 2010 Asian Games in Guangzhou, China.

Early life
Alam was born and raised in Khulna, where she attended Pioneer Girls High School. By 2007, the year she was in sixth standard, she was playing both handball and volleyball for her school. She lived some distance away, and travelled there by rickshaw, a trip that would take about 40 to 50 minutes.

Alam's interest in sports then attracted the attention of Sheikh Salahuddin, a player and coach of the Khulna Division men's cricket team, who lived opposite the school. Unlike the other school girls, who wore shalwar kameez, Alam would make her rickshaw trip to school in sports attire. Salauddin spotted her on some of her rickshaw journeys, and eventually asked her whether she wanted to play cricket. She immediately agreed.

At that time, Alam was not a follower of cricket, and did not understand the rules. However, she was told that Bangladesh would soon have its own women's team, and that was an incentive for her to try out.

Alam's parents were supportive. "My father only told me to return home before the evening Azaan and not do anything that would bring shame to the family," she told CricTracker in 2020. Even more supportive was her grandmother, who would take her to and from matches.

In her initial cricket trials, Alam "failed miserably". However, her coach had spotted that she had ample natural ability, and she had always been fit. After practising for a month, she became a fast bowler. Shortly afterwards, she was the leading wicket-taker in a seven-team tournament, with 13 wickets, and was called-up to the national camp. Her prompt success at cricket caused some problems for her and her family:

Alam did not, and does not, have a role model. In the first two years she was playing cricket, she was not able to follow the game very much. Then, one of her coaches showed her some YouTube videos of Brett Lee. The coach suggested that she generate more pace and swing by following Lee's bowling action. From then onwards, she would identify and follow two or three players "from every nation", but her one and only cricketing idol is Mashrafe Mortaza.

Career 

The first time Alam took the field for the national team was during a Hong Kong tour of Bangladesh in March 2008. "When I was selected for Bangladesh, I had to ask my father whether I should play or do my exams?" she has said. His response was "... you may only have one chance to play for your country but you will have 3 chances to pass your exam".

Alam therefore played in all four of the matches in the unofficial 50-over format series. During the last one, at Mirpur Stadium, she took a hat-trick with the only three balls she bowled, in the 47th over, a feat that caused quite a stir:

Alam made her ODI debut against Ireland on 26 November 2011. She made her T20I debut against India on 28 August 2012. In June 2018, she was part of Bangladesh's squad that won their first ever Women's Asia Cup title, winning the 2018 Women's Twenty20 Asia Cup tournament. Later the same month, she was named in Bangladesh's squad for the 2018 ICC Women's World Twenty20 Qualifier tournament.

On 28 June 2018, she became the first bowler for Bangladesh to take a five-wicket haul in WT20Is, in a match against Ireland.

In October 2018, she was named in Bangladesh's squad for the 2018 ICC Women's World Twenty20 tournament in the West Indies. She was the joint-leading wicket-taker for Bangladesh in the tournament, with six dismissals in four matches. Following the conclusion of the tournament, she was named as the standout player in the team by the International Cricket Council (ICC).

In August 2019, she was named in Bangladesh's squad for the 2019 ICC Women's World Twenty20 Qualifier tournament in Scotland. In November 2019, she was named in Bangladesh's squad for the cricket tournament at the 2019 South Asian Games. The Bangladesh team beat Sri Lanka by two runs in the final to win the gold medal. In January 2020, she was named in Bangladesh's squad for the 2020 ICC Women's T20 World Cup in Australia.

In November 2021, she was named in Bangladesh's team for the 2021 Women's Cricket World Cup Qualifier tournament in Zimbabwe. In January 2022, she was named as one of three reserve players in Bangladesh's team for the 2022 Commonwealth Games Cricket Qualifier tournament in Malaysia. Later the same month, she was named in Bangladesh's team for the 2022 Women's Cricket World Cup in New Zealand.

References

External links

 
 

1993 births
Living people
People from Khulna
Bangladeshi women cricketers
Bangladesh women One Day International cricketers
Bangladesh women Twenty20 International cricketers
Khulna Division women cricketers
Sylhet Division women cricketers
IPL Velocity cricketers
Northern Zone women cricketers
Cricketers at the 2010 Asian Games
Asian Games medalists in cricket
Cricketers at the 2014 Asian Games
Bangladeshi women cricket captains
Asian Games silver medalists for Bangladesh
Medalists at the 2010 Asian Games
Medalists at the 2014 Asian Games
South Asian Games gold medalists for Bangladesh
South Asian Games medalists in cricket